In algebra, Matlis duality is a duality between Artinian and Noetherian modules over a complete Noetherian local ring.

Statement

Suppose that R is a Noetherian complete local ring with residue field k, and choose E to be an injective hull of k (sometimes called a Matlis module). The dual DR(M) of a module M is defined to be HomR(M,E). Then Matlis duality states that the duality functor DR gives an anti-equivalence between the categories of Artinian and Noetherian R-modules. In particular the duality functor gives an anti-equivalence from the category of finite-length modules to itself.

Examples

Suppose that the Noetherian complete local ring R has a subfield k that maps onto a subfield of finite index of its residue field R/m. Then the Matlis dual of any R-module is just its dual as a topological vector space over k, if the module is given its m-adic topology. In particular the dual of R as a topological vector space over k is a Matlis module. This case is closely related to work of Macaulay on graded polynomial rings and is sometimes called Macaulay duality.

If R is a discrete valuation ring with quotient field K then the Matlis module is K/R. In the special case when R is the ring of p-adic numbers, the Matlis dual of a finitely-generated module is the Pontryagin dual of it considered as a locally compact abelian group.

If R is a Cohen–Macaulay local ring of dimension d with dualizing module Ω, then the Matlis module is given by the local cohomology group H(Ω). In particular if R is an Artinian local ring then the Matlis module is the same as the dualizing module.

Explanation using adjoint functors
Matlis duality can be conceptually explained using the language of adjoint functors and derived categories: the functor between the derived categories of R- and k-modules induced by regarding a k-module as an R-module, admits a right adjoint
(derived internal Hom)

This abstract fact then gives rise to the above-mentioned equivalence.

See also

Grothendieck local duality

References

Commutative algebra
Theorems in algebra